Roy Kortsmit (born 26 August 1992) is a Dutch professional footballer who currently plays as a goalkeeper for NAC Breda in the Dutch Eerste Divisie.

Youth career

Born just outside Rotterdam at Hook of Holland, Kortsmit began his youth career at Feyenoord, until he was 15 years old. He left the then KNVB Cup champions in 2007, but didn't move far as he joined local side Westlandia. He spent a year with them and, in 2008, joined Feyenoord's rivals Sparta. The goalkeeper made his first appearance at under-19 level in a 3-1 defeat to sc Heerenveen. The following year, Kortsmit played in Sparta's reserve squad for two seasons and played 20 games, during which they were relegated from the Beloften Eredivisie.

Sparta Rotterdam

Finally, on 11 April 2014, aged 22, he made his professional debut against SC Telstar. He was a half-time substitution for Khalid Sinouh and conceded an 87th-minute winner in a 2-1 home loss. He also made a second-half appearance in a 3-1 away defeat in a relegation/promotion play-off game, at the hands of FC Dordrecht.  Kortsmit has now made more than 100 professional appearances for Sparta, he was heavily involved in the successful promotion battle in 2015–16. He made international headlines in 2017 by pulling off four consecutive saves in just six seconds in a 1-0 away defeat to Den Haag.

Honours

Club
Sparta Rotterdam
 Eerste Divisie: 2015–16

References

External links
 
 

1992 births
Living people
Dutch footballers
People from Hook of Holland
Association football goalkeepers
Feyenoord players
RKVV Westlandia players
Sparta Rotterdam players
Almere City FC players
NAC Breda players
Eredivisie players
Eerste Divisie players
Footballers from South Holland